The septum of the scrotum is a vertical layer of fibrous tissue that divides the two compartments of the scrotum.  It consists of flexible connective tissue. Its structure extends to the skin surface of the scrotum as the scrotal raphe. It is an incomplete wall of connective tissue and nonstriated muscle (dartos fascia) dividing the scrotum into two sacs, each containing a testis.
 
Histological septa are seen throughout most tissues of the body, particularly where they are needed to stiffen soft cellular tissue, and they also provide planes of ingress for small blood vessels. Because the dense collagen fibres of a septum usually extend out into the softer adjacent tissues.  A septum is a cross-wall. Thus it divides a structure into smaller parts.

The scrotal septum is used in reconstructive surgery to restore tissue and or reproductive organs injured or severed by trauma.

See also 

 Sebileau's muscle
 Pierre Sebileau
 Perineal raphe
 Linea nigra

Bibliography 

 Books

References 

Scrotum
Connective tissue